Slavny (masculine), Slavnaya (feminine), or Slavnoye (neuter) is the name of several inhabited localities in Russia:
Slavny, Tula Oblast, an urban locality (an urban-type settlement) in Tula Oblast
Slavny, name of several rural localities in Russia
Slavnaya, a rural locality (a village) in Tambov Oblast
Slavnoye, a rural locality (a village) in Tver Oblast